The 2006 A-League Grand Final, the first edition of the A-League grand final was played between Sydney FC and Central Coast Mariners to decide the champion of the 2005–06 season. The Grand Final took place at Aussie Stadium in Sydney on 5 March 2006 after Sydney FC won the ground advantage after defeating Adelaide United in the major semi-final.

In the Grand Final, a goal from Steve Corica in the second half secured the premiership for Sydney. As the winners of the Grand Final, Sydney qualified through to the 2007 AFC Champions League joining Adelaide United who were the minor premiers.

Road to the final

Match

Details

|style="vertical-align:top"|
|style="vertical-align:top;width:50%"|

Statistics

See also
2005–06 A-League
List of A-League honours

References

External links
Full Match highlights on YouTube
Official A-League Website

Final
2006
Central Coast Mariners FC matches
Sydney FC matches
Soccer in Sydney